Ian Christe (born 1970 in Biel/Bienne, Switzerland) is an author, disc jockey and the publisher of Bazillion Points Books. He attended Mynderse Academy, The Clarkson School's Bridging Year, and Indiana University Bloomington (1987-1990).

Christe is the author of the heavy metal history book Sound of the Beast: The Complete Headbanging History of Heavy Metal, published in English in 2003 and subsequently translated into French, German, Finnish, Spanish, Japanese, Portuguese, Croatian, Italian, Czech, Serbian, and Polish. A weekly radio show known as Bloody Roots was launched in 2004 based on the book, on the Hard Attack/Liquid Metal station of Sirius XM Radio. Hosted by Christe, the show focuses on specific eras or styles of heavy metal, with Christe discussing them in-depth. He also hosted a brief daily spot on the Sirius Buzzsaw channel for several years. His first published work was in the IAN fanzine, and he started as a radio host at WEOS in Geneva, New York, at age 14.

As a freelance magazine writer, his articles appeared in Rolling Stone, Popular Mechanics, Spin, AP, Wired, Revolver, CMJ, Stance, Bananafish, Mother Jones, The Baffler, the Chicago Reader, Warp, Blender, Salon.com, HotWired, Mass Appeal, the Utne Reader, I.D., and Guitar World. Christe has also made film and television appearances on VH1 Classic, MTV2, VH1, and several metal-related documentaries. He has penned liner notes to releases by Megadeth, Death, Mantas, William Hooker, and others.

His unusual metal band, Dark Noerd the Beholder, appears on the soundtrack to the cult film Gummo. Christe also recorded with the bluegrass band Grouse Mountain Skyride, the experimental drone metal band Kuboaa, and performed during 2000 and 2001 as singer with the Jacques Dutronc "couvert" band Les Opportunistes, one of the first bands of the early 2000s Brooklyn rock renaissance.

In 2007, Christe launched Bazillion Points Publishing to promote books by deserving like-minded authors.

On June 30, 2010 Bazillion Points Publishing released Touch and Go: The Complete Hardcore Punk Zine '79-'83 by Tesco Vee and Dave Stimson. The book chronicles the 22 issues of Touch and Go, the DIY hardcore punk fanzine. The zine was the precursor to Touch and Go Records.

Publications
Sound of the Beast: The Complete Headbanging History of Heavy Metal. by Ian Christe. , HarperCollins.
Everybody Wants Some: The Van Halen Saga. by Ian Christe. , Wiley & Sons.
Marooned: The Next Generation of Desert Island Discs. , Perseus Books.
"AC/DC: High Voltage Rock 'n' Roll: The Ultimate Illustrated History ". , Voyageur Press.
The Trouser Press Guide to 90s Rock. Edited by Ira Robbins.
Voter Participation and the States. by Jamie Cooper and Ian Christe, Center for Policy Alternatives.

External links
Ian Christe's weblog
Ian Christe's Twitter
Sound of the Beast website
Bazillion Points Publishing
Ian Christe, Interview on MetalUpdate.com
Interview with Ian Christe by Sufian Mohamed Salleh

1970 births
Living people
Swiss writers
Swiss DJs
People from Biel/Bienne
Indiana University Bloomington alumni